The 1946 All-Ireland Junior Hurling Championship was the 25th staging of the All-Ireland Junior Championship since its establishment by the Gaelic Athletic Association in 1912. It was the first championship to be completed in the aftermath of the Emergency.

Limerick entered the championship as the defending champions.

The All-Ireland final was played on 6 October 1946 at Nowlan Park in Kilkenny, between Kilkenny and London, in what was their first ever meeting in a final. Kilkenny won the match by 5-04 to 2-02 to claim their second championship title overall and a first title since 1928.

Results

All-Ireland Junior Hurling Championship

All-Ireland semi-final

All-Ireland home final

All-Ireland final

References

Junior
All-Ireland Junior Hurling Championship